Isocentris filalis is a moth of the family Crambidae described by Achille Guenée in 1854. It is found in Cameroon, Comoros, the Democratic Republic of the Congo, Réunion, Madagascar, Mauritius, Togo Indonesia (Java), Myanmar and Taiwan.

Adults are bright yellow.

The larvae feed on Euphorbia virosa and Flueggea virosa.

References

External links
 

Pyraustinae
Moths described in 1854
Moths of Sub-Saharan Africa
Moths of the Comoros
Moths of Madagascar
Moths of Mauritius
Moths of Réunion